The Nebraska State Capitol is the seat of government for the U.S. state of Nebraska and is located in downtown Lincoln. Designed by New York architect Bertram Grosvenor Goodhue in 1920, it was constructed of Indiana limestone from 1922 to 1932. The capitol houses the primary executive and judicial offices of Nebraska and is home to the Nebraska Legislature—the only unicameral state legislature in the United States.

It was the first state capitol to incorporate a functional tower into its design. Goodhue stated that "Nebraska is a level country and its capitol should have some altitude or beacon effect." In 1976, the National Park Service designated the capitol a National Historic Landmark, and in 1997, the Park Service extended the designation to include the capitol grounds, which Ernst H. Herminghaus designed in 1932.

Dimensions and features

The structure is anchored by a three-story,  square base. This square base houses offices most frequently visited by the public. The second floor (main floor) is home to the office of the Governor of Nebraska, the Nebraska Supreme Court, the Nebraska Court of Appeals, and the Nebraska Legislature.

From the center of the base, a tower rises , crowned by a gold-tiled dome. The finial—The Sower and its pedestal—add an additional  to the building's height.

Goodhue originally envisioned much of the tower to house the collections of the Nebraska State Library, and he planned for each of the  tower floors to include glass-floored stacks for book storage. As early as November 1920, however, Goodhue indicated that the tower could serve any purpose, including office space. By September 1925, the Capitol Commission decided that the tower should be built for office space. Tower floors continue to house various offices today.

In total, there are 15 stories in the capitol (three mechanical levels also exist within the tower between the 3rd and 4th floors).

Lincoln Municipal Code places height restrictions on structures within the designated Capitol Environs District. This code helps to maintain the capitol's title as the tallest building in Lincoln. The capitol held the title of tallest building in Nebraska until 1969 with the completion of the  Woodmen Tower in downtown Omaha. With the completion of Omaha's  First National Bank Tower in 2002, the capitol became the third-tallest building in Nebraska.

Capital cities, capitol buildings

Congress officially opened Nebraska Territory with the passage of the Kansas-Nebraska Act of 1854. Almost instantly a factional divide between North Platters (those living north of the Platte River) and South Platters (those living south of the Platte) arose over the question of capital location. Much to the chagrin of the South Platters, Acting Governor Thomas B. Cuming selected the small northern village of Omaha City for the seat of government. Cuming was from Iowa, and as his political allies were investors in the Council Bluffs and Nebraska Ferry Company, Omaha as capital would be beneficial to his personal political career. 
Results from the first territorial census, however, revealed 914 North Platters and 1,818 South Platters. The South Platters, with greater legislative representation, would be able to take the capital, but Cuming ignored proportional representation and assigned seven councilmen and fourteen representatives to the north and six councilmen and twelve representatives to the south. The North Platters, with greater political power, confirmed Omaha as the capital.

In Omaha, two structures served the Territory of Nebraska. The first was a two-story brick building donated by the Council Bluffs and Nebraska Ferry Company. This building, formerly located on 9th Street between Douglas and Farnam, served the Territorial Legislature for the sessions of 1855 and 1857.  A second building, constructed in 1857–58 on the site of present-day Omaha Central High School, served the remaining sessions of the Territorial Legislature and the first sessions of the State Legislature beginning in 1867. In June 1867, the Third Session of the State Legislature passed Senate Bill Number 44 which "provid[ed] for the location of the Seat of Government of the State of Nebraska, and for the erection of public building thereat." The bill also created a commission (remembered as the Capital Commission) whose charge was to select a capital site somewhere within the boundaries of Seward County, the southern halves of Butler and Saunders counties, and the northern half of Lancaster County. On July 29, 1867, the Capital Commission selected the village of Lancaster as the capital city and renamed it Lincoln.

In Lincoln, two structures first served the State of Nebraska. On October 10, 1867, the Capital Commission contracted Chicago architect John Morris to build a statehouse in Lincoln on the newly platted Capitol Square (bounded by the streets of 14th and 16th, H and K). Morris designed the capitol with local limestones which began to deteriorate upon the building's completion in late 1868. By 1879, the State of Nebraska determined to replace its crumbling statehouse through piecemeal construction of a new capitol. Architect William H. Willcox designed a Renaissance Revival capitol, and the legislature appropriated $75,000 for construction of its west wing—finished in 1881. The same year, the legislature appropriated $100,000 for an east wing, which was finished in 1882. In 1883, the legislature authorized the Board of Public Lands and Buildings to raze the old capitol and construct the central portion of the Willcox design, not to exceed $450,000. The State of Nebraska finally completed its new, second state capitol in 1888.
The second state capitol began to experience structural issues, especially in its foundation, within a couple of decades of its completion. After the building was deemed unsafe, the Nebraska Legislature made several attempts to fund the construction of a third state capitol.

Architectural history 

On February 20, 1919, the Nebraska Legislature passed House Roll 3 which established the Nebraska Capitol Commission to oversee construction of a new statehouse. The next day, Governor McKelvie signed the bill with its emergency clause and appointed the new commission. William E. Hardy, president of Hardy Furniture Company, and Walter W. Head, vice president of the Omaha National Bank, were Republicans from Lincoln and Omaha respectively. William H. Thompson, a prominent lawyer, was a Democrat from Grand Island. The three citizen members joined the ex officio members, Governor McKelvie and State Engineer George E. Johnson, to become the Nebraska Capitol Commission.

House Roll 3 declared that the cost of the capitol was not to exceed $5 million and established the Capitol Fund, which consisted of the proceeds of a special property tax. The Capitol Commission let the Capitol Fund accrue for two years before construction in order to have ample cash reserves. Throughout construction of the capitol, the legislature extended the levy and ultimately raised the spending limit to $10 million. The Nebraska State Constitution limits state indebtedness, so most state projects must be funded on a "pay-as-you-go" basis. The State of Nebraska funded the capitol under the same principles, and the final cost, $9,800,449.07, was completely paid when the Capitol Commission dissolved in 1935.

Competition program 

One of the Capitol Commission's first actions was to hire Omaha architect Thomas Rogers Kimball to serve as the commission's professional advisor. Kimball, who was president of the American Institute of Architects, devised a two-stage competition for the selection of a capitol architect. In the preliminary stage, the commission invited Nebraska architects to submit capitol designs and hired Irving Kane Pond to serve as judge. Together, Pond and the commission selected Ellery L. Davis (Lincoln), John Latenser & Sons (Omaha), and John McDonald and Alan McDonald (Omaha) to compete in the final stage. Next the commission opened the final stage to nationally known architects including: Bliss & Faville (San Francisco), Bertram Grosvenor Goodhue (New York), H. Van Buren Magonigle (New York), McKim, Mead, and White (New York), John Russell Pope (New York), Tracy & Swartwout (New York), and Paul Cret and Zantzinger, Borie and Medary (Philadelphia).

Kimball wrote an innovative competition program that did not dictate plan, style, or material for the capitol. The program did state, however, the commission's desire that the architect collaborate with "sculptor, painter, and landscapist" to create a unified design. Finally, Kimball organized the competition so that the jury was selected only after the ten competitors had submitted their designs to the Capitol Commission. The designs were identified by numbers and "separate sealed envelopes contained the architects' names and plan numbers." Next, the Capitol Commission chose the first of three competition jurors, Waddy Butler Wood; the competitors chose the second, James Gamble Rogers; and Wood and Rogers chose the third, Willis Polk. On June 26, 1920, the jury chose the author of design "Number 4" as the architect of the Nebraska State Capitol. The author of design "Number 4" was Bertram Grosvenor Goodhue.

Goodhue's design 

Goodhue designed the Nebraska State Capitol in a roughly Classical architectural style, and he felt "impelled to produce something quite unlike the usual...thing of the sort, with its veneered order and invariable Roman dome." Goodhue employed Classical principles of geometric form and hierarchical arrangement but eliminated the traditional use of columns, pediments, and domes. In addition to the restrained Classical vocabulary, Goodhue mixed elements of Achaemenid, Assyrian, Byzantine, Gothic, and Romanesque architecture.

Goodhue was a well-established church architect. He designed St. Bartholomew's Church (New York), the West Point Cadet Chapel, and the Church of the Intercession (New York). The Nebraska State Capitol features similar church vocabulary. The plan is a modified cross-in-square plan enclosed by a  square. Four arms radiate from a central domed rotunda, upon which rises the tower with its unarticulated windows and flat surfaces—much like an enlarged spire.

Construction 

In March 1922, the Capitol Commission built an electric railroad spur from Lincoln's Burlington yards. The state-owned line ran along H Street from 7th to 14th Streets and provided an easy means for delivery of construction materials. Then on April 15, 1922, Governor Samuel R. McKelvie ceremonially broke ground, thus beginning a ten-year construction process which occurred in four phases. Building in phases allowed construction to commence before demolition of the old statehouse. With completion of the capitol's Phase 1 in 1924, state operations moved into the new structure. The old capitol was subsequently razed. On April 23, 1924—just two years into the capitol's construction—Bertram Goodhue died, and his associates formed a firm, Bertram Grosvenor Goodhue Associates, to finish the capitol and other ongoing Goodhue projects. After construction ended in 1932, the Capitol Commission hired Lincoln landscape architect Ernst Herminghaus to design the grounds.

Integrated art program 

Bertram Goodhue employed two New York artists, Lee Lawrie and Hildreth Meière, in both the exterior and interior ornamentation of the Nebraska State Capitol. Lawrie, a sculptor, designed all of the engaged relief panels and buttress figures of the exterior, along with interior column capitals, doors, and fireplace surrounds. Meière, a muralist, designed the marble mosaic panels of the floors and the ceramic tile panels of the vaults.

On January 20, 1922, the Capitol Commission requested Goodhue to consult with Dr. Hartley Burr Alexander, of the University of Nebraska's department of philosophy, "to work out the inscriptions to be used on the Capitol Building." In addition to the inscriptions, Alexander began to work closely with Goodhue and Lawrie on the themes of the exterior sculptures. When Goodhue died in 1924, Alexander feared that the thematic development in future portions of the capitol would be inconsistent with the established schemes. He therefore wrote an overarching thematic program, "Nebraska State Capitol: Synopsis of Decorations and Inscriptions," in July 1926. Alexander's synopsis thus served as a guide for the remaining interior and exterior decorations, and Alexander was bestowed with the title of Thematic Consultant.

Exterior

The exterior of the Nebraska State Capitol is architecturally composed of two parts: the three-story,  square base and the  tower. Alexander envisioned the base, with its inner cross, as an emblem of the quarters of the Earth representing the drama of human experience, and he envisioned the tower as Earth's gnomon representing human ideals. The Sower—the  finial atop the capitol's gold-tiled dome—completes the vertical movement of the exterior symbolism representing agriculture and the  "chief purpose in forming society, to sow nobler ideas of living."

Lee Lawrie designed the principal exterior decoration, representing the history of Western law. The Sower, his best-known work at the capitol, is the only work there that is in the round, or free-standing. The remaining ornamentation is engaged within the building's limestone in bas-relief, pierced, and buttress form. After Lawrie finalized his designs in plaster maquettes, the Edward Ardolino stone carving contractor employed Alessandro Beretta to execute the carving in situ. Beretta would take as long as ten weeks per panel, and use as many as 70 different tools. He finished the carving on November 19, 1934.

The Main Portal

The main portal introduces the sculpted ornamentation representing the foundation of life on the Great Plains. Two parapets adorned with relief panels of bison flank the main stairs. The bison represent Plains Indians indigenous to Nebraska, and the principal nations are inscribed within the panels (alphabetically): 
 Arapahoe
 Arikara

 Cheyenne
 Kiowa

 Pawnee
 Ponca

 Omaha
 Otoe

 Sioux
 Winnebago

19th century European Americans are also represented above the main entrance with the gilded relief, Spirit of the Pioneers. The relief sits directly atop Alexander's inscription: "The Salvation of the State is Watchfulness in the Citizen." Additionally, an inscription at the crown of the main portal reads: "Wisdom, Justice, Power, and Mercy, Constant Guardians of the Law." Four buttress figures flank the inscription representing the aforementioned guardians.

The Promenade Circuit

The names of the ninety-three counties of Nebraska are inscribed along the top of the base of the capitol and are loosely grouped by number of letters per name. Directly above the county names, twenty-one panels (eighteen bas-reliefs, three pierced) represent the creation of law. The panels are best observed from the promenade, beginning on the northwest corner of the building:

Hebrew Law: Northwest
 Moses Bringing the Law from Sinai
 Deborah Judging Israel
 The Judgment of Solomon

Greco-Roman Law: West
 Solon Giving a New Constitution to Athens
 The Publishing of the Twelve Tables in Rome
 The Establishment of the Tribunate of the People

Greco-Roman Law: Southwest
 Plato Writing His Dialog on the Ideal Republic
 Orestes Before the Areopagites
 The Codification of Roman Law under Justinian

Historical Documents: South (pierced panels)
 The Signing of the Declaration of Independence
 The Magna Carta
 The Writing of the Constitution of the United States

English Law: Southeast
 The Codification of Anglo-Saxon Law under Ethelbert
 Milton Defending Free Speech before Cromwell
 Burke Defending America in Parliament

Freedom in America: East
 Las Casas Pleading the Cause of the Indian
 The Signing of the Pilgrim Compact on the Mayflower
 Lincoln and the Emancipation Proclamation

Nebraska Law: Northeast
 The Purchase of Louisiana from Napoleon
 The Kansas-Nebraska Bill
 The Admission of Nebraska as a State in the Union
Ten buttress sculptures along the top of the capitol's south arm represent the great western lawgivers. The buttress figures are depicted in chronological order from west to east and are best observed from the south steps with the exception of the first and the last. The figures of Minos and Napoleon are best observed from the northwest and northeast courtyards respectively:
 Minos
 Hammurabi

 Moses 
 Akhnaton

 Solon 
 Solomon

 Julius Caesar
 Justinian

 Charlemagne
 Napoleon

The Tower

Eight buttress sculptures around the base of the tower represent the ideals of culture. The buttress figures are best observed from within the four courtyards or at a distance from the sidewalk around the building:
Northwest
 Pentaour: Dawn of History
 Ezekiel: Cosmic Tradition

Southwest
 Socrates: Birth of Reason
 Marcus Aurelius: Reign of Law

Southeast
 St. John the Apostle: Glorification of Faith
 Louis IX: Age of Chivalry

Northeast
 Isaac Newton: Discovery of Nature
 Abraham Lincoln: Liberation of Peoples

Landscape

In May 1933, under ever-worsening economic conditions, the Nebraska Legislature re-appropriated the Capitol Commission's unexpended budget. With depleted funds, the commission resolved to terminate its own existence, leaving some projects like the interior murals and the courtyard fountains incomplete. In 2017, the State of Nebraska installed the originally-planned fountains in cast-bronze in each of the Capitol's four courtyards.

Interior

The interior of the Nebraska State Capitol's monumental corridor is architecturally composed of three rooms: Vestibule, Great Hall, and Rotunda. Decorations expanding upon themes of Nebraska are read in a specific sequence beginning at the main, north door. Monumental ornamentation is also found within the Governor's Suite, the Warner Legislative Chamber (former senate), the George W. Norris Legislative Chamber (unicameral), and Memorial Chamber (14th floor).

Meière designed the black and white marble mosaic panels of the Great Hall and Rotunda representing the Procession of Life. Working with Alexander, Meière drew her inspiration from the Siena Cathedral after the two toured the cathedral in the summer of 1925. Meière also drew inspiration from Siena for her ceiling designs of the Vestibule, Great Hall, and Rotunda representing Nature, Man, and Society. In addition to her thematic consultation with Alexander, Meière collaborated closely with the Rafael Guastavino Company of New York to create decorative timbrel vaulting. The vaults are composed of two types of ceramic tiles: glazed polychrome tile and unglazed acoustical terracotta tile called Rumford.

Vestibule

The Vestibule introduces the interior ornamentation of the capitol and represents Gifts of Nature. The sun is the room's central motif and is prominently featured as a medallion within the dome. The dome also incorporates mosaic images of agriculture, flora, and fauna. The vaulting is supported by the largest columns in the capitol—four  monoliths of Red Verona marble. The columns' capitals, designed by Lee Lawrie, are vaguely Corinthian and feature bull motifs inspired from ancient Persepolis architecture.

Great Hall

The Great Hall follows the Vestibule and represents Life of Man. Three medallions—Traditions of the Past, Life of the Present, and Ideals of the Future—anchor the mosaic vaulting. Additionally, sixteen mosaic panels within the arches depict scenes of human activity, including an Architect, a Ball Player, and a Scientist.

The Procession of Life begins in the Great Hall's floor with the mosaic Genius of Creative Energy—an Apollo-like figure—surrounded by Cosmic Energy, lightning, moons, orbs, etc. Three tondi (circular) mosaics follow, depicting the Spirit of the Soil, the Spirit of Vegetation, and the Spirit of Animal Life.

The Great Hall also introduces the Nebraska Hall of Fame—a collection of bronze busts of noteworthy Nebraskans. The capitol's Thematic Consultant, Hartley Burr Alexander, is among the 26 current inductees.

Rotunda

The Rotunda follows the Great Hall and represents Virtues of the State. Eight winged virtues form a celestial rose within the mosaic dome: Temperance, Wisdom, Faith, Justice, Magnanimity, Charity, Hope, and Courage.

The Procession of Life continues in the Rotunda's floor with the mosaic panel Vital Energy, which shows the Genius of Life—an Eros-like figure with butterflies and pine cones. At the Rotunda's center, four tondi mosaics representing the Genius of Water, the Genius of Fire, the Genius of Air, and the Genius of Earth surround a larger tondo mosaic of Earth as the Life-giver. A mosaic band, or guilloche, interlaces the five tondi and depicts the fossil life of the Great Plains. Meière based the fossil mosaics on scientific illustrations drawn by University of Nebraska geologist Erwin Hinckley Barbour. The Procession of Life concludes at the Rotunda's south entrance with The Family.

Warner Legislative Chamber (east)

The Warner Legislative Chamber is located to the east of the Rotunda and was originally designed for the Nebraska House of Representatives. In 1927, the Capitol Commission concluded that the chamber was of inadequate size for the representative body, so the Goodhue Associates enlarged the original west, senate chamber design (which was not yet constructed) and reassigned it for use by the house. Upon the capitol's completion in 1932, the Capitol Commission thus reassigned the east chamber to the Nebraska Senate. The chamber served the senate during the 1933 and 1935 legislative sessions. With the 1937 inception of the unicameral legislature, the east chamber functioned as a committee hearing room and today serves as a public gathering space. On February 4, 1998, the Ninety-Fifth Nebraska Legislature named the chamber in honor of state senators Charles Warner and Jerome Warner with the passage of Legislative Resolution 322.

The chamber represents Plains Indians—Nebraska's first inhabitants. The chamber's mahogany doors, designed by Lee Lawrie, introduce the theme and depict a woman and a man standing on either side of a tree of life comprising cornstalks. Each door weighs , and Lincoln artisan, Keats Lorenz, executed the carving.

Meière designed the mosaic dome to emulate beadwork, and the vaulting depicts four scenes of Indian life. Alexander also shared images of indigenous art with Meière for inspiration, including ledger art by Amos Bad Heart Bull. Meière used one particular drawing depicting a Sun Dance rite for the design of a tapestry above the speaker's niche.

George W. Norris Legislative Chamber (west)

The George W. Norris Legislative Chamber is located to the west of the Rotunda. Upon the chamber's completion in 1932, it served the Nebraska House of Representatives during the 1933 and 1935 legislative sessions. In 1937, the chamber—being the larger of the two legislative halls—began to serve the unicameral legislature. On February 16, 1984, the Eighty-Eighth Nebraska Legislature named the chamber in honor of U.S. Senator George W. Norris with the passage of Legislative Resolution 257.

The chamber represents Euro-American expansion. The chamber's tooled-leather doors, designed by Meière, introduce the theme and depict a tree of life scene styled with Assyrian and Egyptian motifs.

Meière also designed the gold leaf patterns on the walnut-beamed ceiling. The dominant images depict the three Euro-American powers that have claimed the land that is today Nebraska: Spain (castle and lion), France (fleur-de-lis and honey bee), and the United States of America (shield and bald eagle).

Murals

The mural program of the capitol is composed of twenty-one defined murals throughout the monumental hallways and Law Library, and a series of allegorical scenes within the Governor's Suite.

On September 22, 1925, the Capitol Commission accepted proposals by New York artist Augustus Vincent Tack to paint rooms within the Governor's Suite—proposals begun with Bertram Goodhue prior to his death in 1924. Tack completed and installed his series of allegorical figures in November 1927.

On February 21, 1930, the Capitol Commission hired Lincoln artist Elizabeth Dolan to paint a mural on the north wall of the Law Library. Dolan completed The Spirit of the Prairie in August 1930. It is the only mural in the capitol painted in situ.

Apart from the Governor's Suite and the Law Library, Goodhue designed 20 recessed mural spaces for the monumental hallways of the capitol. In May 1933, under ever-worsening economic conditions, the Nebraska Legislature re-appropriated the Capitol Commission's unexpended budget. With depleted funds, the commission resolved to terminate its own existence, leaving the mural project incomplete.

In 1951, the Nebraska Legislature created the Capitol Mural Commission and empowered it to complete the mural program. Over the next 50 years, the Capitol Mural Commission held a series of competitions to select artists for the remaining murals. The commission also used details from Dr. Hartley Burr Alexander's original thematic plan to guide the subject matter of the murals. 

{|class="wikitable sortable" style="width:45%"
|+Capitol Murals
! width = 8% | Artist
! width = 8% | Title
! width = 3% class="unsortable" | Mural
! width = 3% | Date
! width = 3% | Material
! width = 2% class="unsortable" | Dimensions
! width = 10% | Location
|-
| Augustus Vincent Tack || Governor's Suite Series || ||1927 || Oil on linen ||||Governor's Suite
|-
| Elizabeth Dolan || The Spirit of the Prairie || ||1930 || Oil on linen||||Law Library
|-
| Kenneth Evett || The Labors of the Hand || || 1954 ||| Oil on linen |||| Rotunda
|-
| Kenneth Evett || The Labors of the Head ||  ||1956 ||  Oil on linen |||| Rotunda
|-
| Kenneth Evett || The Labors of the Heart ||  ||1956 ||  Oil on linen ||||Rotunda
|-
| James Penney || The Homesteader's Campfire ||  ||1963 || Oil on linen ||||Vestibule
|-
| James Penney || The First Furrow ||  ||1963 || Oil on linen |||| Vestibule
|-
| James Penney || The House Raising ||  ||1963 || Oil on linen |||| Vestibule
|-
| Jeanne Reynal || The Blizzard of 1888 || ||1965 || Glass mosaic ||||Great Hall
|-
| F. John Miller  || The Coming of the Railroad || ||1966 || Glass mosaic ||||Great Hall
|-
| Reinhold Marxhausen || The Spirit of Nebraska || ||1966 || Glass mosaic ||||Great Hall
|-
| Jeanne Reynal || The Tree Planting || ||1966 || Glass mosaic ||||Great Hall
|-
| Reinhold Marxhausen || The Building of the Capitol || ||1966 ||Glass mosaic ||||Great Hall
|-
| Charles Clement || The U.S. Survey || ||1966 || Glass mosaic ||||Great Hall
|-
| Stephen Roberts || The Ideal of International Law || ||1996 || Oil on linen ||||Memorial Chamber
|-
| Stephen Roberts || The Perils of Fire || ||1996 ||   Oil on linen ||||Memorial Chamber
|-
| Stephen Roberts || The Ideal of Freedom || ||1996 ||   Oil on linen ||||Memorial Chamber
|-
| Stephen Roberts || The Scourge of Poverty || ||1996 ||   Oil on linen ||||Memorial Chamber
|-
| Stephen Roberts || The Ideal of Universal Peace || ||1996 ||  Oil on linen ||||Memorial Chamber
|-
| Stephen Roberts || The Scourge of Plague || ||1996 ||  Oil on linen |||| Memorial Chamber
|-
| Stephen Roberts || The Ideal of Self-Determination || ||1996 ||   Oil on linen ||||Memorial Chamber
|-
| Stephen Roberts || The Scourge of Famine || ||1996 ||  Oil on linen ||||Memorial Chamber
|-
|}

 Lincoln Monument 

The Lincoln Monument, located on the capitol's west grounds, is composed of the  bronze statue, Abraham Lincoln, created by Daniel Chester French, and the corresponding granite plinth and stele, designed by architect Henry Bacon.

On February 12, 1908, the Young Men's Republican Club organized the Abraham Lincoln Memorial Association to seek funds for the erection of an Abraham Lincoln statue on the Nebraska State Capitol grounds, and on July 8, 1908, the association invited Frank M. Hall to organize a committee to commission a sculptor. The committee (including Hall, State Auditor Silas Barton, Dr. H.B. Lowry, General Charles F. Manderson, Governor Ashton C. Shallenberger, Addison Waite, and Gurdon Wattles), awarded French the commission on June 24, 1909, and the committee unveiled the monument on September 2, 1912. Bacon and French later collaborated on the Lincoln Memorial (1914–22) in Washington, D.C.

The Lincoln Monument predates the current statehouse, and the Capitol Commission drew special attention to the monument during the final stage of competition to select an architect for a new capitol in 1920. In a note to the competing architects, the commission wrote, "Solutions should consider this monument and suggest for it a proper part in the ensemble, preferably but not imperatively on the building site proper." Construction of the new capitol commenced in 1922, and the Lincoln Monument remained intact.

Social history

Because of its prominent tower the capitol is popularly nicknamed "Tower on the Plains" or "Penis of the Plains."

The capitol and its grounds are a frequent site of political demonstrations, rallies, and news conferences.

Social history timeline

July 1934: Lincolnites sleep on capitol lawn during heatwave; Capitol Commission worries blankets will kill grass
January 16, 1935: Dan Hellweg dies after jumping from the fourteenth floor
June 13, 1935: Mari Sandoz receives telegram at her Nebraska State Historical Society office on the ninth floor announcing that she won the Atlantic Monthly Press nonfiction contest for her biography Old JulesOctober 10, 1936: President Franklin D. Roosevelt address crowd of 30,000 in front of north entrance
November 13, 1945: Roy Kohler dies after falling or jumping from the fourteenth floor
December 31, 1948: State installs wire fencing above parapet wall of the fourteenth floor observation decks to prevent falls or jumps
May 29, 1954: Dick Cavett "sloshes" white paint on the statue of William Jennings Bryan, which stands on the capitol's north plaza
February 12, 2001: Same-sex couples hold wedding ceremonies on the west steps of the Capitol, showing support for legalization of same-sex marriage as a part of National Freedom to Marry Day.
April 10, 2002: Nebraska Coalition for LGBT Civil Rights organizes a human chain around the Capitol in protest of Nebraska Initiative 416.
July 17, 2004: Neo-nazis hold a rally at the north steps of the Capitol. The rally was opposed by a far larger anti-Nazi counterprotest.
July 12, 2005: The body of James Exon lay in state in the Capitol rotunda.
May 30–31, 2020: Police fire CS gas and rubber bullets at Black Lives Matter demonstrators protesting police brutality at the Capitol and on Lincoln Mall, to the west of the building. While protestors had their hands up, police shot them in the face; one was blinded and another suffered a shattered nose.

Gallery

See also
List of state and territorial capitols in the United States

 Notes 

a.  McCready reprinted the majority of Alexander's "Nebraska State Capitol: Synopsis of Decorations and Inscriptions" in Appendices V and VI of his 1974 article, "The Nebraska State Capitol: Its Design, Background and Influence."

References

Citations

Sources

 
 
 

 
 

 Whitaker, Charles Harris and Hartley Burr Alexander.  The Architectural Sculpture of the State Capitol at Lincoln, Nebraska, Bertram Grosvenor Goodhue: architect, Lee Lawrie: sculptor, architects after Mr. Goodhue's death in 1924: Bertram Grosvenor Goodhue associates.''  New York: Press of the American Institute of Architects, 1926.  16 pp.; 45 illustrations.

External links 
Nebraska State Capitol site
Interactive tour of Nebraska State Capitol

Government buildings completed in 1932
Buildings and structures in Lincoln, Nebraska
Government of Nebraska
National Historic Landmarks in Nebraska
Skyscrapers in Nebraska
State capitols in the United States
Government buildings in Nebraska
Art Deco architecture in Nebraska
Bertram Goodhue buildings
Tourist attractions in Lincoln, Nebraska
Government buildings on the National Register of Historic Places in Nebraska
History of Lincoln, Nebraska
National Register of Historic Places in Lincoln, Nebraska
Skyscraper office buildings in Nebraska
1932 establishments in Nebraska